Winston W. "Win" Borden (September 1, 1943 – January 20, 2014) was an American lawyer, businessman, and politician.

Born in Brainerd, Minnesota, Borden received his bachelor's degree from St. Cloud State University, his master's degree from University of Minnesota, and his law degree from University of Minnesota Law School. He practiced law, was a lobbyist, and owned a fish farm business. Borden served as a Democrat in the Minnesota State Senate from 1971 until 1978 when he resigned to work for the Minnesota Association of Commerce and Industry. He died in Brainerd, Minnesota.

Notes

1943 births
2014 deaths
People from Brainerd, Minnesota
St. Cloud State University alumni
University of Minnesota Law School alumni
Minnesota lawyers
Businesspeople from Minnesota
Democratic Party Minnesota state senators
20th-century American businesspeople
20th-century American lawyers